William Francis Gray Swann (August 29, 1884 – January 29, 1962) was an Anglo-American physicist.

Education 
He was educated at Brighton Technical College and the Royal College of Science from which he obtained a B.Sc. in 1905. He worked as an Assistant Lecturer at the University of Sheffield, while simultaneously pursuing a doctorate at University College London, from which he received a D.Sc. in 1910.

Career 
Swann left Sheffield in 1913, when he went to the United States to join the Carnegie Institute, becoming head of the Physical Division of the Department of Terrestrial Magnetism. He later became a professor at the University of Minnesota, then at the University of Chicago and Yale University. E. O. Lawrence, the 1939 Nobel Laureate in Physics, was one of Swann's graduate students at the University of Minnesota.

In 1924 Swann was an Invited Speaker of the International Congress of Mathematicians in Toronto. In 1927 at the age of 43, he became the first director of the Bartol Research Foundation of the Franklin Institute. Among his first acts as Director was to arrange a contract to locate the Foundation at Swarthmore College, which is fairly close to Philadelphia. He continued as Director of the Foundation until his retirement in 1959, when he was replaced by Martin A. Pomerantz.

He is particularly noted for his research into cosmic rays and high-energy physics. He produced over 250 publications, including his influential, popular book The Architecture of the Universe in 1934.

Recognition 
Swann was awarded the Elliott Cresson Gold Medal by the Franklin Institute in 1960. The lunar impact crater Swann is named after him.

Other interests 
In addition to being a physicist, he was also known as an accomplished cellist and he founded the Swarthmore Symphony Orchestra. He was the president of the American Physical Society from 1931 to 1933, and was a member of the American Philosophical Society. He retired in 1959.

Death 
He died in 1962 in Swarthmore.

References

Further reading
The American Philosophical Society holds a collection of Swann's papers, and has posted a guide to the collection as well as a short biography of Swann; see 

British physicists
1884 births
1962 deaths
Academics of the University of Sheffield
University of Chicago faculty
University of Minnesota faculty
Alumni of University College London
20th-century American physicists
Presidents of the American Physical Society
British emigrants to the United States